December 25 – Eastern Orthodox liturgical calendar – December 27

All fixed commemorations below are observed on January 8 by Orthodox Churches on the Old Calendar.

For December 26th, Orthodox Churches on the Old Calendar commemorate the Saints listed on December 13.

Feasts
 Second Day of the Feast of the Nativity.
 Synaxis of the Most Holy Theotokos.
 Commemoration of the Flight into Egypt of the Most Blessed Theotokos.

Saints
 Saint Archelaus, Bishop of Harran in Northern Mesopotamia (c. 280)
 Saint Zeno (Zenon), Bishop of Maiuma (the port of Gaza), in Palestine (4th century)
 Venerable Evaristus (Evarestos), Monk of the Studion Monastery (825)
 Hieromartyr Euthymius of Sardis (Euthymios the Confessor), Bishop of Sardis (840)
 Venerable Constantine, Monk of Synnada, the former Jew (9th century)

Pre-Schism Western saints
 Saint Dionysius, Pope of Rome (268) 
 Saint Marinus, the son of a senator in Rome, he was martyred by beheading under Numerian (283) 
 Saint Zosimus, a Greek Pope of Rome (418)
 Saint Tathai (Tathan, Tathaeus, Athaeus), Abbot of Llantathan (early 6th century)
 Saint Jarlath, first Bishop of Tuam, founder of the monastery of Cluain Fois, near Tuam (Ireland) (c. 540)
 Saint Theodore the Sacrist, a holy man and contemporary of St Gregory the Great in Rome (6th century) 
 Saint Amaethlu (Maethlu); a church founded by him in the village of Llanfaethlu in Anglesey, Wales, is named after him (6th century)

Post-Schism Orthodox saints
 Saint Nicodemus of Tismana, Romania (1406)
 New Hieromartyr Constantius the Russian, Priest at Constantinople, by beheading (1743)

New martyrs and confessors
 New Hieromartyrs Alexander and Demetrius, Priests (1918)
 New Hieromartyrs Nicholas, Michael, and Nicholas, Priests, and Michael, Deacon (1930)
 New Hieromartyr Leonidas (Antoshchenko), Bishop of Mariisk (1937)
 New Hieromartyr Basil (Mazurenko), Hieromonk (1937)
 Hieromartyr Alexander, Priest (1937)
 New Martyr Augusta (Zashchuk), Schema-Nun (1937)
 Virgin-martyrs Anthisa and Makaria (1937)
 New Hieromartyr Andrew, Bishop of Ufa (1937)
 New Martyr, Valentina, (1937)
 Venernable New Hieromartyr Isaac II (Bobrikov), Archimandrite of Optina Monastery (1938)
 New Hieromartyr Gregory, Priest (1938)
 Virgin-martyrs Augusta and Mary (1938)
 Martyr Agrippina (1938)

Other commemorations
 Repose of Abbot Barlaam of Valaam and Optina Monasteries (1849)
 Repose of Archimandrite Irenarchus (Rosetti) of Mt. Tabor (1859)
 Repose of Elder Serapheim Savvaitis, Hegumen of the Holy Lavra of Saint Sabbas the Sanctified (2003)

Icons
 Icon of the "Mother of God of "Vilna" ("Vilen-Ostrabramsk", "Our Lady of the Gate of Dawn").
 Icon of the Mother of God "the Three Joys".<ref name=THREE>Icon of the Mother of God "the Three Joys". OCA - Feasts and Saints.</ref> 
 Icon of the Mother of God "Merciful" (Greek: Eleousa)."Merciful" Icon of the Mother of God. HOLY TRINITY RUSSIAN ORTHODOX CHURCH (A parish of the Patriarchate of Moscow). 
 Icon of the Mother of God "the Blessed Womb" or "Barlovsk" (1392)Icon of the Mother of God "the Blessed Womb". OCA - Feasts and Saints. 
 Icon of the Mother of God "Baibuzsk" (Baibuskaya) (1852)

Icon gallery

Notes

References

Sources
 December 26/January 8. Orthodox Calendar (PRAVOSLAVIE.RU).
 January 8 / December 26. HOLY TRINITY RUSSIAN ORTHODOX CHURCH (A parish of the Patriarchate of Moscow).
 December 26. OCA - The Lives of the Saints.
 The Autonomous Orthodox Metropolia of Western Europe and the Americas (ROCOR). St. Hilarion Calendar of Saints for the year of our Lord 2004. St. Hilarion Press (Austin, TX). pp. 2–3.
 December 26. Latin Saints of the Orthodox Patriarchate of Rome.
 The Roman Martyrology. Transl. by the Archbishop of Baltimore. Last Edition, According to the Copy Printed at Rome in 1914. Revised Edition, with the Imprimatur of His Eminence Cardinal Gibbons. Baltimore: John Murphy Company, 1916. pp. 397–398.
Greek Sources
 Great Synaxaristes:  26 ΔΕΚΕΜΒΡΙΟΥ. ΜΕΓΑΣ ΣΥΝΑΞΑΡΙΣΤΗΣ.
  Συναξαριστής. 26 Δεκεμβρίου.'' ECCLESIA.GR. (H ΕΚΚΛΗΣΙΑ ΤΗΣ ΕΛΛΑΔΟΣ). 
Russian Sources
  8 января (26 декабря). Православная Энциклопедия под редакцией Патриарха Московского и всея Руси Кирилла (электронная версия). (Orthodox Encyclopedia - Pravenc.ru).
  26 декабря (ст.ст.) 8 января 2013 (нов. ст.). Русская Православная Церковь Отдел внешних церковных связей. (DECR).

December in the Eastern Orthodox calendar